The 2011 Copa Paulista was the 13th edition of São Paulo State Cup. 32 teams participated in the tournament. The winner qualified for 2011 Recopa Sul-Brasileira and 2012 Copa do Brasil.

Format
First stage: the 36 clubs were divided into four groups of nine according to their locations. The top four of each group advanced to the second stage.

Second stage: the 16 clubs were divided into four groups of four. The winner and runners-up of each group advanced to the knockout stage.

Each stage was played in a double round-robin format.

Qualified teams

(Positions after first stage)

First stage

Group 1

Group 2

Group 3

Group 4

Second stage

Knockout stage

References

External links
Federação Paulista de Futebol 

Copa Paulista
Copa Paulista, 2011
Copa Paulista, 2011